Osmond Kelly Ingram (August 4, 1887 – October 15, 1917) was a sailor in the United States Navy during World War I who received the Medal of Honor posthumously.

Biography
Born to Robert L. Ingram and his wife Naomi Elizabeth Lea in Oneonta, Alabama, Ingram entered the Navy November 24, 1903. His ship, was attacked by the German submarine U-61 off Ireland on October 15, 1917. Gunner's Mate First Class Ingram spotted the approaching torpedo, realized it would strike close by the ship's depth charges, thus dooming the ship, and rushed to jettison the ammunition. He was blown overboard when the torpedo struck, thus becoming the United States' Navy's first enlisted man killed in action in World War I as he attempted to save his ship and shipmates. He posthumously received the Medal of Honor for his actions on that day.

Namesakes
The main flagpole and colors at the former Naval Training Center, San Diego are named Ingram Plaza in his honor

Osmond Ingram was decommissioned at Philadelphia on January 8, 1946, and was struck from the Navy List on January 21, 1946. It was sold for scrapping to Hugo Neu June 17, 1946.

Kelly Ingram Park is also named in his honor. It is a  park located in Birmingham, Alabama.

There is a Veterans of Foreign Wars post named after him in Birmingham, Alabama.

Medal of Honor citation
Rank and organization: Gunner's Mate First Class, U.S. Navy. Born: August 4, 1887, Alabama. Accredited to. Alabama.

Citation:

For extraordinary heroism in the presence of the enemy on the occasion of the torpedoing of the Cassin, on 15 October 1917. While the Cassin was searching for the submarine, Ingram sighted the torpedo coming, and realizing that it might strike the ship aft in the vicinity of the depth charges, ran aft with the intention of releasing the depth charges before the torpedo could reach the Cassin. The torpedo struck the ship before he could accomplish his purpose and Ingram was killed by the explosion. The depth charges exploded immediately afterward. His life was sacrificed in an attempt to save the ship and his shipmates, as the damage to the ship would have been much less if he had been able to release the depth charges.

See also

List of Medal of Honor recipients
List of Medal of Honor recipients for World War I

References

External links

1887 births
1917 deaths
United States Navy Medal of Honor recipients
United States Navy sailors
American military personnel killed in World War I
People from Blount County, Alabama
World War I recipients of the Medal of Honor
Military personnel from Alabama